George Howes may refer to:

 George Howes (footballer) (1906–1993), English footballer
 George Howes (entomologist) (1879–1946), New Zealand entomologist and businessman
 George Howes (Vermont Treasurer) (1814–1892), Vermont businessman and political figure
 George Bond Howes (1853–1905), English zoologist